Caroline Wozniacki was the defending champion, but was defeated in the fourth round by Ana Ivanovic.

Victoria Azarenka won the title, defeating Maria Sharapova in the final 6–2, 6–3.

Seeds
All seeds received a bye into the second round.

Draw

Finals

Top half

Section 1

Section 2

Section 3

Section 4

Bottom half

Section 5

Section 6

Section 7

Section 8

Qualifying

Seeds

Qualifiers

Draw

First qualifier

Second qualifier

Third qualifier

Fourth qualifier

Fifth qualifier

Sixth qualifier

Seventh qualifier

Eighth qualifier

Ninth qualifier

Tenth qualifier

Eleventh qualifier

Twelfth qualifier

External links
 Main draw
 Qualifying Draw

BNP Paribas Open - Women's Singles
2012 BNP Paribas Open